The 2018 season is Bangkok United Football Club's 10th existence in the new era since they took over from Bangkok University Football Club in 2009. It is the 3rd season in the Thai League and club's 8th (6th consecutive) season in the top flight of the Thai football league system since returned in the 2013 season.

League by seasons

Competitions

Thai League

Thai FA Cup

Thai League Cup

Squad statistics

Reserve team in Thai League 4

Bangkok United F.C.'s  reserve side Bangkok United F.C.(B) was sent  to compete in the T4 Bangkok Metropolitan Region.

Notes

External links
 Bangkok United F.C. Official Website
 Thai League Official Website
 http://www.fathailand.org/

BKU
2018